Ariake was a ferry launched in 1995. In 2009 it was shipwrecked in Mihama, Mie Prefecture. There were some injuries but all 28 passengers and crew were rescued.

References

Shipwrecks
Shipwrecks of Japan